The Women's 10 metre air pistol SH1 event at the 2008 Summer Paralympics took place on September 8 at the Beijing Shooting Range Hall.

Qualification round

Q Qualified for final

Final

References

Shooting at the 2008 Summer Paralympics
Para